Guy Vander Linden (born April 6, 1948) is an American politician of the Republican Party serving as a member of the Iowa House of Representatives for the state's 84th district. He was elected to his first term in office in 2010.

Vander Linden is a native of Oskaloosa, Iowa and grew up in a family of Dutch origin. He attended the University of Iowa and became a member of the Iowa Beta chapter of Sigma Alpha Epsilon fraternity, graduating with a bachelor's degree in 1970. He received a master's degree from the University of Southern California. He served a United States Marine, eventually reaching the rank of Brigadier General.

Sources 
Iowa State Legislature website listing
Linden campaign website
Iowa House Republicans website

1948 births
University of Iowa alumni
University of Southern California alumni
Republican Party members of the Iowa House of Representatives
Living people
People from Oskaloosa, Iowa
Military personnel from Iowa
United States Marine Corps generals
21st-century American politicians